Lobster Thermidor is a French dish of lobster meat cooked in a rich wine sauce, stuffed back into a lobster shell, and browned. The sauce is often a mixture of egg yolks and brandy (such as Cognac), served with an oven-browned cheese crust, typically Gruyère. The sauce originally contained mustard (typically powdered mustard). Due to the expensive ingredients and extensive preparation involved, lobster Thermidor is usually considered a recipe for special occasions.

History
In January 1891 the play Thermidor by Victorien Sardou opened in the Comédie-Française theatre. The play took its name from a summer month in the French Republican Calendar, during which the Thermidorian Reaction in 1794 occurred, overthrowing Robespierre and ending the Reign of Terror. The recipe of lobster Thermidor was possibly created at Café de Paris by Leopold Mourier, a former assistant to Auguste Escoffier, or it was created in 1894 at Chez Marie. Another source says it was created at Maison Maire, whose owner Mlle. Paillard sold the restaurant to Mourier. Maison Maire was a Parisian restaurant near the Théâtre de la Porte Saint-Martin. Paillard created the name of the recipe due to the play's notoriety. The play was highly controversial and was closed by the authorities, re-opening in March 1896.

The lobster Thermidor at Maison Maire was served like homard Américain, which was made with tomatoes, cayenne, and brandy, but with the addition of English mustard. An early London recipe for Homard à l'Américaine referred to à la Thermidor as a version with the addition of English mustard. An early American recipe for lobster Thermidor left out the tomatoes, cayenne, and mustard and added cream sauce thickened with Béarnaise sauce and a sprinkling of grated cheese. It can be served with Newberg sauce but is differentiated from lobster Newberg by the addition of tomatoes.

See also

 List of seafood dishes
 List of stuffed dishes

References

External links 
  Recipe.

1894 introductions
French cuisine
Lobster dishes
Stuffed dishes